Shornur is a town and a municipality located in the Palakkad district, in the Indian state of Kerala, located on the banks of the Bharathapuzha River.  The town covers an area of 32.28 km2.

Geography 
It has an average elevation of 49 metres (160 feet).

History
This place was originally a part of the Nedunganad Swaroopam dynasty, which ruled over the present-day Pattambi and Ottapalam Taluks. By the end of the 15th century CE, Nedunganad came under the Zamorin of Calicut. The Chieftains of Shornur known as the Kavalappara Moopil Nair maintained his territory as a buffer zone between the Zamorin and the Rajas of kochi often taking sides keeping in mind his personal  interests of the time . With the annexation of Malabar by the British Kavalappara became part of Walluvanad Taluk of Malabar District , with the Taluk headquarters at Perinthalmanna.

Politics 
Shornur became a municipality in 1978 and is divided into 33 electoral wards. It is a part of Shornur Legislative Assembly Constituency and Palakkad Parliamentary Constituency. Shornur assembly constituency was formed in 2011. Before that Shornur municipality was under Pattambi assembly constituency.

Transport 
Shoranur well connected by road to the nearest cities of Thrissur and Palakkad . SH 22 which is also called the Shoranur - Kodungallur road passes through Thrissur, while the Ponnani - Palakkad road passes through Kulappully. 

There are regular bus services to Ottapalam,Thrissur, Chelakkara,Pattambi and Cherpulassery from shoranur. Kulappully serves buses from Palakkad and Guruvayur.

Shoranur Junction is the largest railway station in Kerala and it handle trains to almost all parts of the country. The most popular daily express in Kerala the Venad Express runs between shoranur and Trivandrum.

Educational institutions 
 Institute Of Printing Technology & Government Polytechnic College, Shoranur
 Institute for Communicative and Cognitive Neurosciences, Kavalapara, Shoranur
 Vishnu Ayurveda College, Kulapully, Shoranur
 MPMMSN Trust College, Shoranur
 Carmel CMI School, Shoranur
 Al Ameen Engineering College
 Jyoti engineering college, Cheruthuruthy
 National Research Institute for Panchakarma, Cheruthuruthy

Notable people
 Balan K. Nair, actor
 Meghanathan, actor

See also 
 Shornur Junction
 Walluvanad Taluk
 Palakkad district
 Pattambi

References 

Cities and towns in Palakkad district
Kathakali